Count Viktor Nikitich Panin (1801-1862), politician
 Viktor Yevgenievich Panin (1930-2020), physicist

ru:Виктор Панин